Eduardo Henrique da Silva (born 17 May 1995), known as Eduardo Henrique or simply Eduardo, is a Brazilian professional footballer who plays as a defensive midfielder for Sporting CP.

Club career

Guarani 
Born in Limeira, São Paulo, Eduardo graduated from Guarani's youth setup. He made his professional debut on 21 January 2012, coming on as a late substitute in a 2–1 home win against Oeste for the Campeonato Paulista championship.

São Paulo 
In September 2012 Eduardo moved to São Paulo, on loan until January. After his loan expired, he refused to return to his parent club, and his deal was eventually cancelled in March 2013.

Atlético Mineiro 
Late in the year, Eduardo moved to Atlético Mineiro. He made his Série A debut on 18 May 2014, playing the last 24 minutes of a 2–1 away win against Santos.

Internacional 
In August 2018, Eduardo joined Internacional and in April 2017, he was loaned out to Atlético Paranaense for the rest of the year.

Belenenses SAD 
On 28 June 2018, Eduardo joined Belenenses SAD on loan for the 2018–19 season.

Sporting CP 
On 13 June 2019, Eduardo signed with Sporting CP.

Crotone 
On 10 September 2020, Eduardo joined Crotone on a season-long loan.

International career
On 27 November 2014 Eduardo was called up to Brazil under-20's for the 2015 South American Youth Football Championship, held in Uruguay.

Honours
Atlético Mineiro
Recopa Sudamericana: 2014
Copa do Brasil: 2014
Campeonato Mineiro: 2015

References

External links

1995 births
Living people
People from Limeira
Brazilian footballers
Brazilian expatriate footballers
Association football midfielders
Guarani FC players
Clube Atlético Mineiro players
Sport Club Internacional players
Club Athletico Paranaense players
Belenenses SAD players
Sporting CP footballers
F.C. Crotone players
Al-Raed FC players
Campeonato Brasileiro Série A players
Primeira Liga players
Serie A players
Saudi Professional League players
Brazil youth international footballers
2015 South American Youth Football Championship players
Expatriate footballers in Portugal
Expatriate footballers in Italy
Expatriate footballers in Saudi Arabia
Brazilian expatriate sportspeople in Portugal
Brazilian expatriate sportspeople in Italy
Brazilian expatriate sportspeople in Saudi Arabia
Footballers from São Paulo (state)